Ağıllı can refer to:

 Ağıllı, Bismil
 Ağıllı, Çıldır
 Ağıllı, Horasan
 Ağıllı, Kulp
 Ağıllı is a village in Acıgöl, formerly Dobada/Topada, which is a district of Nevşehir Province in the Central Anatolia region of Turkey.